The 46th District of the Iowa Senate is located in eastern Iowa, and is currently composed of Muscatine and Scott Counties.

Current elected officials
Mark Lofgren is the senator currently representing the 46th District.

The area of the 46th District contains two Iowa House of Representatives districts:
The 91st District (represented by Mark Cisneros)
The 92nd District (represented by Ross Paustian)

The district is also located in Iowa's 2nd congressional district, which is represented by Mariannette Miller-Meeks.

Past senators
The district has previously been represented by:

Delbert W. Floy, 1965–1966
Merle W. Hagedorn, 1967–1968
J. Leslie Leonard, 1969–1970
Charles Peter Miller, 1971–1972
Bass Van Gilst, 1973–1982
James E. Briles, 1983–1984
Leonard Boswell, 1985–1992
Patty Judge, 1993–1998
John Judge, 1999–2000
Paul McKinley, 2001–2002
Gene Fraise, 2003–2012
Chris Brase, 2013–2016
Mark Lofgren, 2017–present

References

46